Love Demands is the sixth studio album by American recording artist Meli'sa Morgan, released in 2018 and issued by Goldenlane Records. The album features Morgan's interpretation on a selection of songs originally recorded by Tom Jones, The Supremes, the Bee Gees, Aretha Franklin and Sam Cooke.

Also included are new tracks co-written Morgan and two bonus tracks of newly recorded versions of her 1980s hit "Fool's Paradise" and "Do Me, Baby", original recorded by Prince.

Track listing

Credits
Credits taken from album liner notes.
Co-producer – Meli'sa Morgan
Instruments [Music By] – Jurgen Engler (tracks: 13, 14)
Lead Vocals, Backing Vocals, Arranged By [Vocal] – Meli'sa Morgan
Backing Vocals [Rap Vocals] – Sabastin Commas (track: 10)
Recorded By [Vocals] – Pete Mills
Management – Asilem Productions
Producer – Gozza (tracks: 7 to 12), Jurgen Engler (tracks: 1 to 6, 13, 14), Slattery (tracks: 7 to 9)

Copyright (c) – Goldenlane Records, Phonographic Copyright (p) – Goldenlane Records
Produced For – EarthMovers Productions – Produced For – Asilem Productions, Inc.

References

External links
Meli'sa Morgan - Love Demands (CD, Album) at Amoeba Music
Meli'sa Morgan - Love Demands - Amazon Music
Meli'sa Morgan - Love Demands (CD) at Cleopatra Record Store

2018 albums
Meli'sa Morgan albums